Tour of Azerbaijan 2005 was the 20th running of the Tour of Iran (Azerbaijan), which took place between 22 May and 29 2005 in Iranian Azerbaijan. The tour had 7 stages, in which Ghader Mizbani from Iran won the first place in over all of the tour.

Stages of the Tour

General classification

References

Tour of Azerbaijan (Iran)